is Misia's 10th single. It was released on August 8, 2002. It reached #1, selling 128,630 copies in its first week. It was used as theme song for the drama "Ren'ai Hensachi" as well as in a commercial for Kirin's "Rakuda" beverage.

Track list

Charts

External links
https://web.archive.org/web/20061117164950/http://www.rhythmedia.co.jp/misia/disc/ Misia discography

2002 singles
Oricon Weekly number-one singles
Japanese television drama theme songs
Misia songs
Songs written by Jun Sasaki
Songs written by Misia